The 2007 UCI Road World Championships took place in Stuttgart, Germany, between September 25 and September 30, 2007. The event consisted of a road race and a time trial for men, women and men under 23. Italian Paolo Bettini and Swiss Fabian Cancellara both won their second world championships in a row in the elite men's road race and time trial respectively.

Participating nations
Cyclists from 59 national federations participated. The number of cyclists per nation that competed is shown in parentheses.

Events summary

Medals table

Gallery

External links

Official website
UCI Website for Road World Championships

 
UCI Road World Championships by year
UCI Road World Championships
UCI Road World Championships
International cycle races hosted by Germany
Sports competitions in Stuttgart
2000s in Baden-Württemberg
September 2007 sports events in Europe